Moro is a Local Government Area in Kwara State, Nigeria.   
It has an area of 3,272 km and a population of 108,792 at the 2006 census.

The postal code of the area is 241.

References

Local Government Areas in Kwara State